Esmerald Aluku (born 31 December 1998) is an Albanian football midfielder.

Club career

FC DAC 1904 Dunajská Streda
Aluku made his professional Fortuna Liga debut for DAC Dunajská Streda against ŽP Šport Podbrezová on 18 February 2017.

References

External links
 FC DAC 1904 Dunajská Streda official club profile 
  
 Futbalnet profile 
  (archive)

1998 births
Living people
Footballers from Tirana
Albanian footballers
Association football midfielders
FC DAC 1904 Dunajská Streda players
Slovak Super Liga players
Albanian expatriate footballers
Expatriate footballers in Slovakia
Albanian expatriate sportspeople in Slovakia